Caitlin Blackwood (born 23 June 2000) is an actress from Northern Ireland who played the young Amy Pond in the BBC One TV programme Doctor Who.

Biography 
Blackwood was born in Antrim, Northern Ireland, in 2000. She moved with her family to Inverness in Scotland when she was six years old and has lived there ever since.

Blackwood played Alexis in the 2015 episode "Preparing the Weapon" of the crowdfunded TV series Cops and Monsters. In 2018 she appeared in a short film called Sundown directed by Ryan Hendrick.

She played the young Amelia Pond in several Doctor Who episodes; "The Eleventh Hour", "The Big Bang", "Let's Kill Hitler", and "The God Complex", with footage of her briefly reused in "The Angels Take Manhattan". She is the cousin of Karen Gillan, who portrayed the adult Amy Pond, although they had never met before Blackwood was cast. The reason she got the role was due to her physical similarity to her older cousin. In 2018, she starred in Sundown, an award-winning short film by Scottish writer and director Ryan Hendrick. In 2020, she played Amy Pond in the Doctor Who short: "The Raggedy Doctor by Amelia Pond".

In 2020, she appeared in the romantic comedy film Lost At Christmas, which also featured Doctor Who actors Sylvester McCoy and Frazer Hines.

Filmography

Film

Television

References

External links
 

2000 births
Living people
21st-century British actresses
British child actresses
People from Antrim, County Antrim
British television actresses
People from Northern Ireland of Scottish descent